Chitek Lake is a resort village in the Canadian province of Saskatchewan within Census Division No. 16. It is on the shores of Chitek Lake in the Rural Municipality of Big River No. 555. The Pelican Lake First Nation reserve borders the resort village.

History 
Chitek Lake incorporated as a resort village on July 1, 1978.

Demographics 

Government 
The Resort Village of Chitek Lake is governed by an elected municipal council and an appointed administrator that meets on the third Thursday of every month. The mayor is Sandra Svoboda and its administrator is Tara Westmacott.

See also 
List of communities in Saskatchewan
List of municipalities in Saskatchewan
List of resort villages in Saskatchewan
List of villages in Saskatchewan
List of summer villages in Alberta

References

External links 

Resort villages in Saskatchewan
Big River No. 555, Saskatchewan
Division No. 16, Saskatchewan